Sunny Moon is the first solo album by Frances McKee.  Containing a much softer and more mellow style of music than her previous days in the Vaselines, the music is more reminiscent of her work in Suckle. All songs were written by McKee except "You Know Who I Am" (Leonard Cohen). The album was described by The Scotsman as a "maudlin but beautiful collection of songs".

Track listing
"The Kindness of Strangers" – 2:51
"The Country Song" – 4:12
"Silence Will Do" – 3:29
"Childish Memories" – 3:46
"You Know Who I Am" – 4:05
"Without Reason" – 4:27
"Vicious Tongue" – 3:17
"Secret Dreams" – 4:06
"Drink in the Sun" – 3:11
"Wasted" – 4:26
"Limbo" – 4:43

Personnel
Frances Mckee – vocals, guitar, piano
Julie McLarnon – guitar, effects, percussion, accordion
Brian Edwards – drums, bass guitar
Paul Blakesley – bass guitar, backing vocals
Semay Wu – cello, piano
Sonia Crohl – cello
Fiona Menzines – piano, flute
Lauren Hyde – drums
Filip Vervaeke – backing vocals

References

2006 debut albums